Găești is a town in Dâmbovița County, Muntenia, Romania with a population of 12,767.

History 

The name of the town comes from a family of nobles (boyars) who owned most of the lands on which the town is now situated. Their name was Găești.

It was first mentioned on 19 July 1498 during the rule of Radu cel Mare, the son of Vlad Călugărul, who donated the land around Găești to the Monastery of Râncăciov. In 1807, most of the buildings of Găești were destroyed by a fire, then in 1812, it was hit by the plague.

Demographics 
According to the census conducted in 2011, the population of Găești is of 13,317 inhabitants. The majority of the inhabitants are Romanians (93.41%), with a minority of Roma (1.71%). For 4.68% of the population, the ethnicity is unknown. Most of the inhabitants are Orthodox (93.97%).

Economy 
Arctic S.A. company is headquartered in the town.

Natives
 Victor Bădulescu, economist
 Florentin Cruceru, footballer
 , musician
 Mihai Popescu, handballer
 Cristian Ristea, kickboxer
 Florin Tănase, footballer
 Gheorghe Zamfir, musician

External links 

 Town Hall
 „Cronica Gaestiului” news paper
 LITERE magazine
 Gaesti guide
 Official website

References

Towns in Romania
Populated places in Dâmbovița County
Localities in Muntenia